The 1990 OTB International Open was a combined men's and women's tennis tournament played on outdoor hard courts that was part of the World Series of the 1990 ATP Tour and of the Tier IV of the 1990 WTA Tour. It was the fourth edition of the tournament and was played at Schenectady, New York in the United States from August 20 through August 27, 1990. Ramesh Krishnan and Anke Huber won the singles titles.

Finals

Men's singles

 Ramesh Krishnan defeated  Kelly Evernden 6–1, 6–1
 It was Krishnan's only title of the year and the 9th of his career.

Women's singles
 Anke Huber defeated  Marianne Werdel 6–1, 5–7, 6–4
 It was Huber's first singles title of her career.

Men's doubles

 Richard Fromberg /  Brad Pearce defeated  Brian Garrow /  Sven Salumaa 6–2, 3–6, 7–6
 It was Fromberg's 3rd title of the year and the 3rd of his career. It was Pearce's only title of the year and the 3rd of his career.

Women's doubles
 Alysia May /  Nana Miyagi defeated  Linda Ferrando /  Wiltrud Probst 6–4, 5–7, 6–3

References

OTB Open
OTB International Open
OTB International Open